The 1973 Five Nations Championship was the 44th Five Nations Championship, an annual rugby union competition contested by the men's national teams of England, France, Ireland, Scotland and Wales, and the 79th since it began as the Home Nations Championship. Ten matches were played between 13 January and 14 April 1973.

As each nation won their two home matches (and therefore lost their two away matches), the championship was shared between all five teams; no further tie-break was applied to separate teams finishing level on match points. This was the only time that the Five Nations championship finished in a five-way tie.

Due to the Troubles occurring in Ireland, which had resulted in 13 civilians being killed by the British Army in Derry and in the loss of over 100 British soldiers in 1972 and the potential security risks, both Scotland and Wales had refused to play Ireland in Dublin in 1972. Defying expectations to the contrary, England agreed to travel in 1973. Despite a poor performance, resulting in an 18-9 loss, the crowd in the Lansdowne Road stadium gave a standing ovation to the England team. England captain John Pullin delivered a quip at a post-match dinner - "Well we might not be any good but at least we turned up" - to great applause.

Participants
The teams involved were:

Table

Squads

Results

References

External links

The official RBS Six Nations Site

Six Nations Championship seasons
Five Nations
Five Nations
Five Nations
Five Nations
Five Nations
Five Nations
 
Five Nations
Five Nations
Five Nations
Five Nations